Real Chance of Love (season 1) is the first season of the VH1 reality television dating series entitled Real Chance of Love. Brothers Ahmad Givens (Real) and Kamal Givens (Chance), former contestants on I Love New York, are the central figures. The show, which premiered October 20, 2008, features seventeen female contestants taking part in various challenges in a format similar to other VH1 and MTV dating contest programs. Each week, women are eliminated until the final episode where the brothers had to make their final selections. Ultimately, Ahmad selected "Corn Fed", while Kamal did not select a winner. The series consisted of 14 episodes.

Contestants

Elimination order

 The contestant won the competition as Real's girl.
 The contestant got a "R" chain from Real.
 The contestant got a "C" chain from Chance.
 The contestant was eliminated.
 The contestant did not receive a chain but was allowed to stay.
1 The contestant won a date with Real.
2 The contestant won a date with Chance.

 In Episode 9 there was a cliffhanger, so the elimination was not shown until Episode 10.
 Episode 11 was a recap before the finale.
 In Episode 12, Chance did not choose anyone, although he revealed on the reunion if he had to, he'd have chosen Risky.
 Episode 13 was a recap before the reunion.

Episodes

Love is in the Stallion-Air
First aired October 20, 2008

Bottom Five: Lusty, Harmony, So Hood, Stalker, Isha
Eliminated: Harmony, Stalker, Isha
Chance's Girls: Cali, Rabbit, Risky, Bubbles, Meatball, Promo, So Hood
Real's Girls: Bay Bay Bay, Sexy Legs, K.O., Corn Fed, Milf, Ki Ki, Lusty
Episode Notes
Ki Ki told Real that K.O. (who was there for Real) gave Chance a lap dance, but it was actually Meatball (they both had on black dresses) who gave him the lap dance.
Stalker made a clock for Chance, which he ended up breaking. He didn't like it because, it reminded him of Flavor Flav. On I Love New York, one of the reasons New York eliminated Chance is because he started to remind her of Flav.
Bubbles and So Hood got into an argument over the way Bubbles talks. Chance didn't like this at all and almost eliminated So Hood because of it.
Lusty and Milf were the only girls to flirt with both Real and Chance at the mixer.
Stalker and Bubbles broke one of the beds by continually jumping on it.
Lusty was talking to herself in the mirror when the other girls were fighting. Promo caught her doing it and was creeped out.
During elimination, Chance picked Promo to be one of his girls, and she almost denied him because she was initially more interested in Real.
Reasons For Elimination
Stalker: Chance disliked the clock she made for him, and he didn't like the way she was always following him around, and never seemed to leave him alone.
Harmony: Chance thought her breath smelled bad, and didn't have as strong of a connection with her as he did with some of the other girls.
Isha: She didn't make an effort to talk to Chance or Real and just kind of lingered in the background.

Don't Cross Me Bra!
First aired October 27, 2008

 Challenge winners: Bubbles, Cali, Milf, Sexy Legs
 Bottom Two: Corn Fed, Sexy Legs
 Eliminated: Sexy Legs
 Chance's Girls: Cali, Rabbit, Risky, Bubbles, So Hood, Meatball
 Real's Girls: Promo, K.O., Milf, Bay Bay Bay, Ki Ki, Lusty, Corn Fed
Episode notes
 In this week's challenge, the girls were given their own booths at the "Stallionaire Fair". The two girls from Real's side and Chance's side who had the most tickets at the end won a group date. On the date, the winners helped Chance and Real record a demo for their album.
 During elimination, Real gave his first chain to Promo. She was scared to take it at first because she thought Chance was going to get really mad. Chance was disappointed, but didn't yell or get out of control.
 Since Real took Promo from him, Chance offered his first chain to Milf, but she didn't want it.
 Chance and Real's younger brother Micah made an appearance.
 The girls found out that Real was the first black man Corn Fed had dated.
 Chance saw Real and Promo talking outside, so he went and started flirting with Sexy Legs. She denied him and moved away when he tried to kiss her. He felt embarrassed, so he told Real that she was trying to make moves on him.
Reasons for elimination
 Sexy Legs: Real believed Chance when he told him that Sexy Legs was trying to make moves on him. Even though nothing big really happened, he took his brother's word about it.

Slam, Bam, Thank You Ma'am
First aired November 3, 2008

Challenge: SSA Wrestling
Challenge Winners: K.O., So Hood, Bay Bay Bay, Ki Ki, Rabbit
Bottom Three: K.O., Promo, So Hood
Eliminated: Promo, So Hood
Chance's Girls: Risky, Rabbit, Bubbles, Cali, Meatball
Real's Girls: Milf, Bay Bay Bay, Ki Ki, Corn Fed, Lusty, K.O.
Episode Notes
This week's challenge, the girls had to form into 3 wrestling teams and fight each other, while Chance and Real watched. The team that put on the best show, won a group date. On the date, the winners went fishing with Chance and Real.
K.O., So Hood, Bay Bay Bay, Ki Ki and Rabbit were the Pink Team. Risky, Lusty, Corn Fed and Cali were the Grey Team. Promo, Milf, Bubbles and Meatball were the Blue Team.
The girls were given their own wrestling names during the challenge. Corn Fed (Whiskie Dixie), Risky (1-Eyed K), Cali (Safari), Lusty (Tiki The Torturer), Bubbles (Thunder Rolls), Milf (Peace Keeper), Promo (French Tickler), Meatball (Poison Sumac), Bay Bay Bay (Cutter), K.O. (Pom Pom), Ki Ki (Miss Mystery), Rabbit (Nurse Hatchett) and So Hood (Gangsta Geisha).
Chance and some of the girls think that K.O. is a lesbian after she seems more affectionate with other girls in the house than with Real. This led to a heated argument between Bay Bay Bay and K.O., because it was brought up during the group date.
During the group date, Real said their brother, Micah, told him that Cali was a "industry girl".
Lusty and Ki Ki get into a heated argument about if Ki Ki is "real" and Ki Ki talks trash about Lusty's deceased mother.
During elimination, Chance calls So Hood down to the carpet. She thinks she's going to get her chain, but Chance actually reveals that she's a bit too much for him. So Hood is upset about it, and Chance seems a little upset about the choice he had to make, too. He gives her one last hug, and then she leaves.
The Pink Team won the first annual SSA (Stallionaire Slam Association) heavyweight championship belt.
Reasons For Elimination
So Hood: Chance thought she was too forward with her sexual side, and was stopping him from getting to spend time to get to know the other girls.
Promo: Real thought she wasn't making a good enough effort to get to know him since she didn't really come to him wanting to talk like the other girls. Chance decided not to give her another chance with him because she was a flip-flopper, and it would just be her switching from one brother to the other again.

Who Wants to be a Stallionaire?
First aired November 10, 2008

Challenge: Stallionaire Barn Yard Clean Up
Challenge Winners: Bubbles, Ki Ki
Bottom Two: Lusty, Ki Ki
Eliminated: Lusty
Chance's Girls: Bubbles, Cali, Risky, Meatball, Rabbit
Real's Girls: Milf, K.O., Corn Fed, Bay Bay Bay, Ki Ki
Episode Notes
This episode began with Ki Ki insulting Lusty's deceased mother. Bubbles tried to break it up. K.O. intervened, acting as though she was about to hit Ki Ki.
In this week's challenge, the girls were paired up into teams to clean up the Stallionaire barn, and put all the animals back in their proper places. The team that did the best job, would win a group date, which consisted of a barbecue with Chance and Real.
Meatball and Bay Bay Bay were Team 1. K.O., Cali and Lusty were Team 2. Corn Fed and Risky were Team 3. Milf and Rabbit were Team 4. Ki Ki and Bubbles were Team 5.
Team 1's tasks were washing the pigs, putting the pigs and sheep in their stalls, and cleaning the troughs. Team 2's tasks were wrangling up the geese and turkeys back into their stalls and sweeping up the dirty hay. Team 3's tasks were washing and brushing the horses and cleaning their hooves. Team 4's tasks were stacking the hay and shoveling up the manure. Team 5's tasks were feeding the fowl, goats, sheep and pigs, putting the lambs and donkeys in their stalls, and brushing the donkey's teeth.
Team 5 ended up winning the challenge, and were rewarded with a date with Chance and Real.
Later in the episode, after Lusty and Milf told Real what Ki Ki said about her mother, he asked her to apologize, and she hesitated at first. After speaking with her mother over the phone, she apologized, but only to appease Real.
Chance was told by his brother Micah that Cali was an "industry girl". When word gets back to Cali, she confronts Chance and tells him she's only in the industry because she is a make-up artist.
Before elimination, Lusty gives Real a massage in his room. She revealed to him that her last boyfriend married another woman without telling her and jokes that she killed him because of it.
 This is the first elimination that Chance gave out his Chain first.
Reasons For Elimination
Lusty: Real thought she wasn't mentally stable and was worried when she said she killed her last boyfriend, even though she claims she was joking.

Great Balls of Fire!
First aired November 17, 2008

 Guest: Kaba Modern
 Challenge: Dance Competition
 Challenge winners: Corn Fed, Ki Ki, Cali, Bay Bay Bay, Risky
 Bottom Three: Rabbit, Meatball, K.O.
 Eliminated: Meatball
 Chance's Girls: Cali, Risky, Bubbles, Rabbit
 Real's Girls: Milf, Corn Fed, Bay Bay Bay, Ki Ki, K.O.
Episode notes
 In this week's challenge the girls formed teams and put on a dance competition for Chance and Real. The team that danced the best won a group date with Chance and Real, this took place at a Stallionaire concert.
 The girls picked their own team names for the competition. Corn Fed, Ki Ki, Cali, Bay Bay Bay and Risky were The Stallionettes. Milf, Meatball, Rabbit, Bubbles and K.O. were Mixed Spice.
 Chance and Real's younger brother Micah made an appearance. He performed on stage with them during the concert.
 Sun Ra (Seashell) from episode 8 of Flavor of Love: Charm School, introduced the Stallionaires to the stage.
 Some of the songs The Stallionaires performed were "Summer Luv Child" and "Life of The Party".
 Kaba Modern, from the first season of America's Best Dance Crew, help the girls practice for the challenge.
 Real and Chance have dinner with the other brother's girls to get to know them.
 Bubbles reveals during the dinner that she did not think she needed god to be a good person.
 K.O. revealed during the dinner, that she was adopted and she was sad because she didn't have a family to introduce Real to.
 Real told Rabbit he was starting to have feelings for her. She felt awkward about the whole situation, but she feels that Chance has not made a connection with her. This would be the second time Real started to like one of Chance's girls, the first being Promo.
 Rabbit gave Chance swimming trunks as a gift, but it came off that he didn't really care about it. She also made homemade cheesecake with Corn Fed and they gave it to Chance and Real. Chance didn't really like it, and spit it out.
 Meatball made spaghetti and meatballs for Chance, but he didn't like it and claims it made him sick.
 During elimination Real offered his second chain to Rabbit, after asking for Chance's approval, but she didn't take it and said that she wanted to stay with Chance. Real proceeded to offer it to her two more times, but she denied him again. Chance then offered a chain to K.O., which she tearfully refused to take. K.O. was ultimately offered a chain from Real, which she accepted, grabbing the chain from him.
 Rabbit at first denied Chance's chain, because she felt like he wasn't showing her that he liked her, or wanted to make an effort to get to know her. He said he would make more of an effort.
Reasons for elimination
 Meatball: Chance didn't feel a connection with her, like he had with the other girls.

From One Brother to Another
First aired November 24, 2008

Challenge: Pimp Out Rides
Challenge Winners: Cali, Rabbit, Bay Bay Bay, Corn Fed, Milf
Bottom Two: Milf, Ki Ki
Eliminated: Ki Ki
Chance's Girls: Rabbit, Cali, Bubbles, Risky
Real's Girls: Corn Fed, K.O., Bay Bay Bay, Milf
Reason for Elimination
Ki Ki: Real felt that Ki Ki was too vicious and didn't care about hurting other people

Kid's Games and Old Flames
First aired December 1, 2008

Challenge: Mother Skills Challenge
Challenge Winners: Corn Fed, Bubbles
Bottom Four: Bubbles, Rabbit, Milf, Bay Bay Bay
Eliminated: Bubbles
Chance's Girls: Rabbit, Cali, Risky
Real's Girls: Corn Fed, K.O., Bay Bay Bay, Milf
Episode Note
Bay Bay Bay was supposed to be eliminated, but at the last second Real changed his mind and offered her an "invisible chain" which she accepted.
Reason for Elimination
Bubbles: Bubbles admitted to Chance on their date that she wasn't feeling a connection to him, and that she still had feelings for someone else.

Ride or Die
First Aired December 8, 2008

Challenge: Ride or Die Challenge
Challenge Winners: Risky, Bay Bay Bay
Bottom Two: Bay Bay Bay, K.O.
Eliminated: K.O.
Chance's Girls: Rabbit, Cali, Risky
Real's Girls: Corn Fed, Bay Bay Bay, Milf
Reasons for Elimination
K.O.: Real felt that she still had growing up to do, and had even stated that if she hadn't walked out of the house earlier, Bay Bay Bay would have been sent home.

The Parent Trap, Part I
First aired December 15, 2008

The Parent Trap, Part II
First aired December 29, 2008

Eliminated: Rabbit, Milf
Chance's Girls: Cali, Risky
Real's Girls: Corn Fed, Bay Bay Bay
Reason for eliminations
Rabbit: Chance said he felt a better connection to Risky and Cali.
Milf: Real thought there was too much drama surrounding Milf.

The Clip Show
First aired January 5, 2009

Thunder in Paradise
First aired January 12, 2009

 Eliminated: Risky, Cali, Bay Bay Bay
 Chance's Girl: No One
 Real's Girl: Corn Fed
Reasons for Eliminations
 Bay Bay Bay: Real felt a stronger connection to Corn Fed
 Risky: Chance admitted that he hadn't fallen for Risky or Cali
 Cali: Chance admitted that he hadn't fallen for Cali or Risky

Memoirs of a Stallionaire
First aired January 21, 2009

Some of the never-before-scenes included were:
 The contestants casting tapes
 Bubbles' fascination with fruit smoothies
 Real and Chance's video diaries
 More scenes of the girls getting eliminated
 Rabbit and Corn Fed both wanting to leave the house on the same night
 Chance walking in on Real and Milf in the bedroom
 An extended preview of the reunion show

Reunion show
First aired January 26, 2009

After the show
 Cali (Christine Ly) and Milf (Ahmo Hight) appeared in the second season of I Love Money, where they placed 10th and 14th place respectively.
 A few days after the reunion show was taped, Corn Fed and Real ended their relationship.
 It was reported on the VH1 blog that there will be a "second season" of Real Chance of Love, with the working title Real Chance of Love 2.
 So Hood (Judith Scullark), Bay Bay Bay (Konanga Tyson), Bubbles (Bianca Sloof), Ki Ki (Lakia Bailey), Risky (Ebony Jones), and K.O. (Roxanne Gallegos) were selected to compete on the third season of Charm School hosted by Ricki Lake, which premiered on May 11, 2009, with Risky (Ebony Jones) being the winner.
 Rabbit (Jessica Rich) made a cameo appearance in the Method Man & Redman video for "Mrs. International".
 Bubbles (Bianca Sloof) was a contestant on the canceled third season of I Love Money, where it is believed she came in 3rd place.
 Corn Fed (Abbi Noah) appeared on the fourth season of I Love Money, where she came in 8th place.
 Ahmed Givens (Real) died on February 20, 2015, after a long battle of colon cancer. He was 35.
 Kamal Givens (Chance) was given a new dating series entitled "One Mo' Chance" on The Zeus Network.

References

External links
 

2008 American television seasons
2009 American television seasons
VH1